In mathematics, more specifically category theory, a quasi-category (also called quasicategory, weak Kan complex,  inner Kan complex, infinity category, ∞-category, Boardman complex, quategory) is  a generalization of the notion of a category. The study of such generalizations is known as higher category theory.

André Joyal has much advanced the study of quasi-categories showing that most of the usual basic category theory and some of the advanced notions and theorems have their analogues for quasi-categories.

Quasi-categories are certain simplicial sets. Like ordinary categories, they contain objects (the 0-simplices of the simplicial set) and morphisms between these objects (1-simplices). But unlike categories, the composition of two morphisms need not be uniquely defined. All the morphisms that can serve as composition of two given morphisms are related to each other by higher order invertible morphisms (2-simplices thought of as "homotopies"). These higher order morphisms can also be composed, but again the composition is well-defined only up to still higher order invertible morphisms, etc.

The idea of higher category theory (at least, higher category theory when higher morphisms are invertible) is that, as opposed to the standard notion of a category, there should be a mapping space (rather than a mapping set) between two objects. This suggests that a higher category should simply be a topologically enriched category. The model of quasi-categories is, however, better suited to applications than that of topologically enriched categories, though it has been proved by Lurie that the two have natural model structures that are Quillen equivalent.

Definition

By definition, a quasi-category C is a simplicial set satisfying the inner Kan conditions (also called weak Kan condition): every inner horn in C, namely a map of simplicial sets  where , has a  filler, that is, an extension to a map .

The idea is that 2-simplices  are supposed to represent commutative triangles (at least up to homotopy). A map  represents a composable pair. Thus, in a quasi-category, one cannot define a composition law on morphisms, since one can choose many ways to compose maps.

One consequence of the definition is that  is a trivial Kan fibration. In other words, while the composition law is not uniquely defined, it is unique up to a contractible choice.

The homotopy category

Given a quasi-category C, one can associate to it an ordinary category hC, called the homotopy category of C. The homotopy category has as objects the vertices of C. The morphisms are given by homotopy classes of edges between vertices. Composition is given using the horn filler condition for n = 2.

For a general simplicial set there is a functor  from sSet to Cat, known as the fundamental category functor, and for a quasi-category C the fundamental category is the same as the homotopy category, i.e. .

Examples

The nerve of a category is a quasi-category with the extra property that the filling of any inner horn is unique. Conversely a quasi-category such that any inner horn has a unique filling is isomorphic to the nerve of some category. The homotopy category of the nerve of C is isomorphic to C.
Given a topological space X, one can define its singular set S(X), also known as the fundamental ∞-groupoid of X. S(X) is a quasi-category in which every morphism is invertible. The homotopy category of S(X) is the fundamental groupoid of X.
More general than the previous example, every Kan complex is an example of a quasi-category. In a Kan complex all maps from all horns—not just inner ones—can be filled, which again has the consequence that all morphisms in a Kan complex are invertible. Kan complexes are thus analogues to groupoids - the nerve of a category is a Kan complex iff the category is a groupoid.

Variants 
An (∞, 1)-category is a not-necessarily-quasi-category ∞-category in which all n-morphisms for n > 1 are equivalences. There are several models of (∞, 1)-categories, including Segal category, simplicially enriched category, topological category, complete Segal space. A quasi-category is also an (∞, 1)-category.

 Model structure There is a model structure on sSet-categories that presents the (∞,1)-category (∞,1)Cat.

 Homotopy Kan extension The notion of homotopy Kan extension and hence in particular that of homotopy limit and homotopy colimit has a direct formulation in terms of Kan-complex-enriched categories. See homotopy Kan extension for more.

 Presentation of (∞,1)-topos theory All of (∞,1)-topos theory can be modeled in terms of sSet-categories. (ToënVezzosi). There is a notion of sSet-site C that models the notion of (∞,1)-site and a model structure on sSet-enriched presheaves on sSet-sites that is a presentation for the ∞-stack (∞,1)-toposes on C.

See also 
Model category
Stable infinity category
∞-groupoid
Higher category theory
 Globular set

References

 Joyal's Catlab entry: The theory of quasi-categories
 
 
 
 

Homotopy theory
Higher category theory